The following is a list of the television and radio networks and announcers who have broadcast the American Football Conference Championship Game throughout the years. The years listed concentrate on the season instead of the calendar year that the game took place. The forerunner to the AFC Championship Game (prior to the 1970 AFL–NFL merger) was the AFL Championship Game.

Television

2020s

2010s

2000s

1990s

1980s

1970s

Radio

2020s

2010s

2000s

1990s

1980s

1970s

See also
List of Super Bowl broadcasters
List of NFC Championship Game broadcasters
List of AFL Championship Game broadcasters
List of NFL Championship Game broadcasters

References

Lists of National Football League announcers
Broadcasters
American Football League announcers
CBS Sports
CBS Radio Sports
Westwood One